The Miss República Dominicana 2006 took place on December 18, 2005. That year only 24 candidates competed for the national crown. The chosen winner represented the Dominican Republic at the Miss Universe 2006 pageant which was held in Los Angeles.

Results

Delegates

 * Withdrew
 ** Had Accident
 *** Disqualified

 Dawilda was born and raised in Hato Mayor del Rey but she went to the capital to go to college at Autonomous University of Santo Domingo.

References

Miss Dominican Republic
2006 beauty pageants
2006 in the Dominican Republic